Magnetic mineralogy is the study of the magnetic properties of minerals. The contribution of a mineral to the total magnetism of a rock depends strongly on the type of magnetic order or disorder. Magnetically disordered minerals (diamagnets and paramagnets) contribute a weak magnetism and have no remanence. The more important minerals for rock magnetism are the minerals that can be magnetically ordered, at least at some temperatures. These are the ferromagnets, ferrimagnets and certain kinds of antiferromagnets. These minerals have a much stronger response to the field and can have a remanence.

Weakly magnetic minerals

Non-iron-bearing minerals 

Most minerals with no iron content are diamagnetic. Some such minerals may have a significant positive magnetic susceptibility, for example serpentine, but this is because the minerals have inclusions containing strongly magnetic minerals such as magnetite. The susceptibility of such minerals is negative and small (Table 1).

Iron-bearing paramagnetic minerals 

Most iron-bearing carbonates and silicates are paramagnetic at all temperatures. Some sulfides are paramagnetic, but some are strongly magnetic (see below). In addition, many of the strongly magnetic minerals discussed below are paramagnetic above a critical temperature (the Curie temperature or Néel temperature). In Table 2 are given susceptibilities for some iron-bearing minerals. The susceptibilities are positive and an order of magnitude or more larger than diamagnetic susceptibilities.

Strongly magnetic minerals

Iron-titanium oxides 

Many of the most important magnetic minerals on Earth are oxides of iron and titanium. At the  end is magnetite, while the  composition is ulvöspinel. The titanomagnetites have an inverse spinel crystal structure and at high temperatures are a solid solution series. Crystals formed from titanomagnetites by cation-deficient oxidation are called titanomaghemites, an important example of which is maghemite. Another series, the titanohematites, have hematite and ilmenite as their end members, and so are also called hemoilmenites. The crystal structure of hematite is trigonal-hexagonal. It has the same composition as maghemite; to distinguish between them, their chemical formulae are generally given as γ for hematite  and α for maghemite.

Iron sulfides 

The other important class of strongly magnetic minerals is the iron sulfides, particularly greigite and pyrrhotite.

Iron alloys

Extraterrestrial environments being low in oxygen, minerals tend to have very little . The primary magnetic phase on the Moon is ferrite, the body-centered cubic (bcc) phase of iron. As the proportion of iron decreases, the crystal structure changes from bcc to face centered cubic (fcc). Nickel iron mixtures tend to exsolve into a mixture of iron-rich kamacite and iron-poor taenite.

See also 
Magnetochemistry

References 

Geomagnetism
Mineralogy